Alfred John Edmonds (16 October 1902 – March 1942), known as Alf or Eddie Edmonds, was an English professional footballer who played in a variety of positions in the Football League for Brighton & Hove Albion, Clapton Orient, Bury and Mansfield Town.

Edmonds retired from full-time football in 1935 to become a publican, but continued to play on a part-time basis for Manchester North End. He died in Bury, Lancashire, in 1942 at the age of 39.

References

1902 births
1942 deaths
Footballers from Brighton
English footballers
Association football utility players
Brighton & Hove Albion F.C. players
Leyton Orient F.C. players
Bury F.C. players
Mansfield Town F.C. players
Manchester North End F.C. players
English Football League players
Publicans